Cansel Elçin (born September 20, 1973) is a Turkish actor.

Biography 

Cansel Elçin was born on September 20, 1973, in İzmir, Turkey, but his family moved to France when he was 9 years old. Elcin grew up trilingually and can speak French, English and Turkish. He studied in the Ecole Florent in Paris, where he was classmates with Audrey Tautou. He has French citizenship. He is known for the hit period series Hatırla Sevgili, with Beren Saat and Okan Yalabık.

In 2009, Elcin directed his first feature film, Kampüste Çıplak Ayaklar. He performs at various theatres.

Filmography

Series

Films
{| class="wikitable"
|-
! Year !! Title !! Role !! Notes
|-
| 1999 || Harem suaré || Journaliste | 
|-
|rowspan="2"| 2000 || Route de nuit || Le medecin de garde ||  
|-
| Le coeur à l'ouvrage || Actor (Hamlet)|| 
|-
| 2001 || L'art (délicat) de la séduction || Designer 4 ||
|-
|rowspan="2"| 2002 || La crim''' ||  Vincent Hartmann ||
|-
| A+ Pollux ||A Friend || 
|-
|rowspan="2"| 2005 || Tu vas rire, mais je te quitte ||   || 
|-
| Navarro || Le chirurgien  ||
|-
|rowspan="2"| 2006 ||L'équilibre de la terreur || Tarek ||  
|-
| Küçük Kıyamet || Zeki || aka The Little Apocalypse (International: English title: festival title) 
|-
| 2008 || 120 ||  Süleyman  ||
|-
|rowspan="3"| 2015 || Bizim Hikaye ||  ||
|-
| Where Atilla Passes (Là où Atilla passe…) || Ahmet ||
|-
| Eve Dönüş || Yusuf Bozyel || 
|-
|}

 Awards 
Elçin won the Best Male TV Actor Award for his role in Hatırla Sevgili'', at Beykent University Faculty of Communations, 2008 Communation Awards; which honors the year's bests as voted by the students.

References

External links 

1973 births
Living people
French people of Turkish descent
Turkish expatriates in France
Turkish male television actors
Turkish male film actors
French male television actors
French male film actors
Cours Florent alumni